And Another Thing may refer to:

And Another Thing... (album), a 2000 Graham Gouldman album 
And Another Thing... (novel), a 2009 novel by Eoin Colfer and part six in The Hitchhiker's Guide to the Galaxy "trilogy"
And Another Thing, a 2007 album by Messiah J and the Expert
The blog of radio host Dave Thompson
And Another Thing, a 2005 book by Jeremy Clarkson